The 1913–14 Bradford City A.F.C. season was the 11th in the club's history.

The club finished 9th in Division One, and reached the 2nd round of the FA Cup.

Sources

References

Bradford City A.F.C. seasons
Bradford City